Martin D'Souza is an Indian editor and Author.

D'Souza worked at The Times of India for 13 years. His last year was as editor of four publications – Rouge, Time 'N Style, Just Jewellery and Viva Voyage. He is also director at Light Infotainment and editor-in-chief at Opening Doorz,.

On December 19, 2006, D'Souza launched his first book, FWD: Stories From Your Inbox. In July 2012, his second book Letting Go, The Healing Power Of Grieving was released at the Shrine of Don Bosco's Madonna.

References

External links
 Official site
 business site
 http://bismumbai.blogspot.in/2012/07/bis-3024-launch-of-book-letting-go.html
 https://openingdoorz.com/

Indian newspaper editors
Living people
Year of birth missing (living people)
Place of birth missing (living people)